The 2015 Lotto-Belisol Belgium Tour  is the third edition of the Lotto-Belisol Belgium Tour, previous called Lotto-Decca Tour, a women's cycle stage race in Belgium. The tour has an UCI rating of 2.2.

Stages

Stage 1
8 September – Quevaucamps to Quevaucamps,

Stage 2
9 September – Moorslede to Moorslede,

Stage 3
10 September – Haaltert to Haaltert, 
Floortje Mackaij (Liv-Plantur) won the third stage in and around Haaltert. She escapes from a front group of nine riders and rode solo to the finish. Emma Johansson from Sweden won behind Mackaij the sprint of the group ahead of the Danish Amalie Dideriksen and is the new leader in the general classification.

Stage 4
11 September – Lierde to Geraardsbergen,

Classification leadership

See also

2015 in women's road cycling

References

External links

Lotto-Belisol Belgium Tour
Lotto-Belisol Belgium Tour
Lotto-Decca Tour